Germinal is a 1993 French epic film based on the 1885 novel by Émile Zola. It was directed by Claude Berri, and stars Gérard Depardieu, Miou-Miou and Renaud. At the time it was the most expensive movie ever produced in France. It was the fourth most attended film of the year in France.

It won the César Award for Best Cinematography and Best Costume Design, and was nominated for Best Film, Best Actress, Best Supporting Actor, Best Supporting Actress, Best director, Best Writing, Best Sound, Best Editing, Best Music and Best Production Design. The film was selected as the French entry for the Best Foreign Language Film at the 66th Academy Awards, but was not accepted as a nominee.

The film, set in the nineteenth century, closely follows the plot of the novel, which is a realistic story of a coalminers' strike in northern France in the 1860s.

Cast 
Miou-Miou as Maheude
Renaud as Étienne Lantier
Jean Carmet as Vincent Maheu dit Bonnemort
Judith Henry as Catherine Maheu
Jean-Roger Milo as Chaval
Gérard Depardieu as Toussaint Maheu
Laurent Terzieff as Souvarine
Bernard Fresson as Victor Deneulin
Jean-Pierre Bisson as Rasseneur
Jacques Dacqmine as Philippe Hennebeau
Anny Duperey as Madame Hennebeau
Gérard Croce as Maigrat
James Ard as the Priest
Frédéric van den Driessche as Paul Négrel
Annick Alane as Madame Grégoire
Pierre Lafont as Léon Grégoire
Yolande Moreau as La Levaque

Reception

Critical reception
The movie was well received by the critics. Review aggregator Rotten Tomatoes reports that 75% of 12 critics gave the film a positive review, for an average rating of 6.9/10.

Box office
The film opened at number one at the French box office with a gross of 29.6 million French franc ($5.2 million) from 314 theatres in its opening week. It expanded to 456 theatres in its second week and remained at number one with a gross of 36.8 million French franc ($6.5 million) and stayed there for a third week. The film had 6,161,776 admissions in France making it the fourth most attended film of the year. The film grossed $36.1 million worldwide.

See also
 List of submissions to the 66th Academy Awards for Best Foreign Language Film
 List of French submissions for the Academy Award for Best Foreign Language Film
 Germinal (1963)

References

Further reading
 Tibbetts, John C., and James M. Welsh, eds. The Encyclopedia of Novels Into Film (2nd ed. 2005) pp 149–150.

External links 

1993 romantic drama films
1993 films
French romantic drama films
French epic films
Films directed by Claude Berri
Films about the labor movement
Films based on works by Émile Zola
Films based on French novels
Films set in 1863
Films about mining
Films with screenplays by Claude Berri
Cockfighting in film
1990s French-language films
1990s French films